Robert Gregory (9 February 1819 – 2 August 1911) was a reforming Anglican Dean

Life
Gregory was born on 9 February 1819.  he was educated at Corpus Christi College, Oxford. There he gained the 'Denyer Theological Prize Essay'. He was ordained in 1843  and began his career with a curacies at Bisley, Wragby and Lambeth.

Gregory was later Vicar of St Mary the Less, Lambeth from 1853 to 1873. After this he was a Canon at St Paul's Cathedral before succeeding to the Deanery in 1891. In 1873 he was elected to the School Board for London. He died on 2 August 1911.

Family
Gregory married in 1844 Mary Frances. They had two sons, including Francis Ambrose Gregory, later became Bishop of Mauritius. His wife died in 1851 and ten years later he married Charlotte Anne Stopford. By his second marriage he had three daughters who survived him. The last was Alice Gregory, who revolutionised the training of British midwifery, setting up the British Hospital for Mothers and Babies.

Notes

1819 births
1911 deaths
Clergy from Nottingham
Alumni of Corpus Christi College, Oxford
Deans of St Paul's
Members of the London School Board